A working group, or working party, is a group of experts working together to achieve specified goals. The groups are domain-specific and focus on discussion or activity around a specific subject area. The term can sometimes refer to an interdisciplinary collaboration of researchers working on new activities that would be difficult to sustain under traditional funding mechanisms (e.g., federal agencies).

The lifespan of a working group can last anywhere between a few months and several years. Such groups have the tendency to develop a quasi-permanent existence when the assigned task is accomplished; hence the need to disband (or phase out) the working group when it has achieved its goal(s).

A working group's performance is made up of the individual results of all its individual members. A team's performance is made up of both individual results and collective results. In large organisations, working groups are prevalent, and the focus is always on individual goals, performance and accountabilities. Working group members do not take responsibility for results other than their own. On the other hand, teams require both individual and mutual accountability. There is more information sharing, more group discussions and debates to arrive at a group decision.

Examples of common goals for working groups include:

 creation of an informational document
 creation of a standard
 resolution of problems related to a system or network
 continuous improvement
 research

Working groups are also referred to as task groups, workgroups, or technical advisory groups.

Characteristics
The nature of the working group may depend on the group's raison d’être – which may be technical, artistic (specifically musical), or administrative in nature.

Administrative working groups
These working groups are established by decision makers at higher levels of the organization for the following purposes:
 To elaborate, consolidate, and build on the consensus of the decision makers; and
 To ensure (and improve) coordination among the various segments of the organization. A shared commitment to agreed common aims develops among the parties as they work together to clarify issues, formulate strategies, and develop action plans.

For example, the Interagency Working Group on Youth Programs is a group of twelve federal agencies within the executive branch of the U.S. government, and is responsible for promoting achievement of positive results for at-risk youth. This working group was formally established by Executive Order 13459, Improving the Coordination and Effectiveness of Youth Programs, on 7 February 2008.

Quality circles are an alternative to the dehumanizing concept of the division of labor, where workers or individuals are treated like robots. Quality circles can help enrich the lives of workers or students and aid in creating harmony and high performance. Typical topics are improving occupational safety and health, improving product design, and improvement in the workplace and manufacturing processes.

Musical working groups
Although any artisan or artist can benefit from being part of a working group, it is especially of great import for session players. Musicians face a variety of challenges that can impede the formation of musical working groups, such as touring and studio recording sessions. Such activities make it that much more difficult to concentrate on the developing the cohesiveness that is required to maintain a working group.

However, working groups have been shown to be rewarding to the stakeholders, as it fosters innovation. By working with the same people frequently, members become familiar with the répertoire of other members, which develops trust and encourages spontaneity.

Some of the more notable musical working groups include:
 Abdullah Ibrahim Trio;
 Alex von Schlippenbach Trio;
 Dave Holland (Trio, Quartet, or Quintet);
 Die Like A Dog Quartet;
 Gary Bartz Quartet;
 Vandermark 5; and
 William Parker Quartet (Trio/Quartet).

Technical working groups

In many technical organizations, for example Standards organizations, the groups that meet and make decisions are called "working groups". Examples include:

 IEC working groups
 IETF working groups (which are subordinate to Areas)
HTTP WG, original led by Dave Raggett
IEEE-SA working groups
IEEE WG802.3, Ethernet Working Group
IEEE WG802.11, Wireless LAN Working Group
 ISO working groups (which are subordinate to an SC (subcommittee), subordinate to a TC (technical committee)
 International Conference on Harmonisation
 International Union of Pure and Applied Chemistry (IUPAC) 
 International Astronomical Union
 W3C working groups
Device Description Working Group
SVG Working Group
Bioethics Council
Consultative Committee for Space Data Systems (CCSDS)
European Cooperation for Space Standardization (ECSS)
US National Institute of Justice (NIJ)

In some cases, like the Printer Working Group, an entire consortium uses the term "working group" for itself.

The rules for who can be a part of the working groups, and how a working group makes decisions, varies considerably between organizations.

Mechanics
It is imperative for the participants to appreciate and understand that the working group is intended to be a forum for cooperation and participation. Participants represent the interests and views of stakeholders from disparate sectors of the community which happen to have a vested interest in the results of the WG. Therefore, maintaining and strengthening communication lines with all parties involved is essential (this responsibility cuts both ways – stakeholders are expected to share what information, knowledge and expertise they have on the issue).

Programmes developed should be evaluated by encouraging community input and support; this will ensure that such programmes meet the community's vision for its future. The WG should also regularly seek community feedback on their projects. Apropos questions to be asked during such meetings include:
 What were the objectives of the program?
 What were the results of the project?
 What effect did the results have on the identified problem?
 What unexpected results — desirable or otherwise — were observed?
 How were the results achieved? (Was it by the methods and techniques originally intended, or did these evolve with implementation?)
 Was there an effective use of community resources?
 Should our objective or methods be changed?

Depending on the lifespan of the WG, involved parties (at the very least) convene annually. However, such meetings may happen as often as once every semester or trimester.

The managers are constantly called upon to make decisions in order to solve problems. Decision making and problem solving are ongoing processes of evaluating situations or problems, considering alternatives, making choices, and following them up with the necessary actions  and now with this managed to reach a continuous improvement.

See also

Leadership
Action group
Facilitation
Facilitator
Herrmann Brain Dominance Instrument
Adhocracy
Interdisciplinarity
Workers' self-management
Learned society
Professional association
Scientific community
Parliamentary system
Public participation
Skills management
Syndicate

References

External links
IETF Working Group Guidelines and Procedures
Tools To Support Participatory Urban Decision Making a component of the United Nations' Urban Governance Toolkit Series (PDF)
Establishing and Supporting the Working Group Process A source book for the Sustainable Cities Programme (PDF)

Research
 
Negotiation
Types of organization